Riley Ayre (born 2 April 1996) is an Australian cricketer. He made his List A debut for Cricket Australia XI on 10 October 2015 in the 2015–16 Matador BBQs One-Day Cup. In February 2020, Ayre signed to play domestic cricket in Ireland during the 2020 summer. He made his first-class debut on 15 March 2022, for New South Wales in the 2021–22 Sheffield Shield season.

References

External links
 

1996 births
Living people
Australian cricketers
Cricket Australia XI cricketers
New South Wales cricketers